Jambhada Hudugi is a 2007 Kannada-language romantic drama film directed by Priya Hassan. The film stars herself, Jai Akash, in his Kannada debut, along with Yash in the lead roles. The film was commercially successful and ran for a hundred days. Actor Yash made his on-screen debut with this movie.

Cast 
 Priya Hassan as Priya
 Jai Akash as Rakesh
 Yash as Lakshmikanth
 Ramesh Bhat
 Jayanthi as Priya's mother
 Bhavya
 Girija Lokesh

Controversy 
The film was not granted a subsidy by the Government of Karnataka. The petitions states that "revolves around womb cultivation and brings awareness to the public with regard to the effects of smoking, drinking, violence etc".

Soundtrack 
The songs were composed by Rajesh Ramanath.

 "Bhoomi Yathe Neenu" - K. S. Chitra
 "Life Fantasy" - Chaitra H. G.
 "Nodi Nodi" - Rajesh Krishnan
 "Gaala Haki" - Hemanth Kumar, Shamita
 "Muthu Muthu" - Chetan Sosca, Shamita

Reception 
A critic from Chitraloka wrote that "`Jambada Hudugi' makes a pleasing viewing and Kannada fans should see and encourage a budding talent like Priya Hasan".

Awards 
 Kannada Film Industry Directors' Association - Best Debut Director - Priya Hassan

References 

Indian drama films
2007 drama films
2007 films
2000s Kannada-language films